Stanhopea is a genus of the orchid family (Orchidaceae) from Central and South America. The abbreviation used in horticultural trade is Stan. The genus is named for the 4th Earl of Stanhope (Philip Henry Stanhope) (1781-1855), president of the Medico-Botanical Society of London (1829-1837).  It comprises 55 species and 5 natural hybrids. These epiphytic, but occasionally terrestrial  orchids can be found in damp forests from Mexico to Trinidad to NW Argentina. Their ovate pseudobulbs carry from the top one long, plicate, elliptic leaf.

Stanhopea is noted for its complex and usually fragrant flowers that are generally spectacular and short-lived. Their pendant inflorescences are noted for flowering out of the bottom of the containers in which they grow, lending themselves to culture in baskets that have enough open space for the inflorescence to push through. They are sometimes called upside-down orchids.

The majority of species are robust plants that grow readily in cultivation. For relatives of Stanhopea see Stanhopeinae and the closely related sister subtribe Coeliopsidinae.

Description 
Most Stanhopea flowers flash prominent, elegant horns on the epichile. The exception are the species; S. annulata, S. avicula, S. cirrhata, S. ecornuta and S. pulla. A second group have short or truncated horns, they include the species; S. candida, S. grandiflora, S. reichenbachiana, S. tricornis and the natural hybrid S. x herrenhusana. The structure of the labellum of this group is in general, not as complex as other members of the genus.

With most Stanhopea flowers lasting three days or less, the flowers must attract pollinators very quickly. These chemical attractants are generated in the hypochile, attracting the male euglossine bees to the flower. These male euglossine bees are known to be important pollinators of Stanhopea flowers, collecting fragrances at these flowers over their lifetime and storing them in their hind tibia. Bees in the Euglossini tribe, including Eulaema meriana, are known to pollinate these flowers supposedly because the orchids can deceptively mimic the form of a female and her sex pheromone. When the bee touches down on the flower, a great effort is made to collect chemical scent - he eventually slides on the waxy surface of the hypochile, gliding down on the slippery lip to exit the flower. The long column is touched in the process, resulting in the bee taking up pollinia at the very tip of the column. When the bee slides down another flower, the pollinia are deposited on the sticky surface of the stigma.

Species 

Stanhopea aliceae Pérez-García, Chiron & Szlach. (Guatemala)
Stanhopea anfracta Rolfe (SE. Ecuador to Bolivia)
Stanhopea annulata Mansf. (S. Colombia to Ecuador)
Stanhopea avicula Dressler (Panama)
Stanhopea bueraremensis Campacci & Marçal (E. Brazil)
Stanhopea candida Barb.Rodr. (S. Trop. America)
Stanhopea cephalopodaa Archila, Pérez-García, Chiron & Szlach. (Guatemala)
Stanhopea chironii Archila, Pérez-García & Szlach. (Guatemala)
Stanhopea cirrhata Lindl. (C. America)
Stanhopea confusa G.Gerlach & Beeche (C. America)
Stanhopea connata Klotzsch (Colombia to Peru)
Stanhopea costaricensis Rchb.f. (C. America)
Stanhopea deltoidea Lem. (Peru to Bolivia)
Stanhopea dodsoniana Salazar & Soto Arenas (NC. & S. Mexico to Guatemala)
Stanhopea ecornuta Lem. (C. America)
Stanhopea embreei Dodson (Ecuador)
Stanhopea florida Rchb.f. (Ecuador to Peru)
Stanhopea fonsecae Archila, Pérez-García, Chiron & Szlach. (Guatemala)
Stanhopea frymirei Dodson (Ecuador)
Stanhopea gibbosa Rchb.f. (= S. carchiensis, = S. impressa; S Colombia to Ecuador)
Stanhopea grandiflora Lindl. (Trinidad to S. Trop. America)
Stanhopea graveolens Lindl.(Mexico to C. America, Brazil to NW. Argentina)
Stanhopea greeri Jenny (Peru)
Stanhopea guttulata Lindl. (SE. Brazil)
Stanhopea haseloffiana Rchb.f. (N. Peru)
Stanhopea hernandezii (Kunth) Schltr. (C. & SW. Mexico)
Stanhopea insignis J.Frost ex Hook. (SE. & S. Brazil)
Stanhopea intermedia Klinge (SW. Mexico)
Stanhopea javieri Archila, Pérez-García, Chiron & Szlach. (Guatemala)
Stanhopea jenischiana F.Kramer ex Rchb.f.(Colombia to NW. Venezuela and S. Ecuador)
Stanhopea lietzei (Regel) Schltr. (E. & S. Brazil)
Stanhopea macrocornata Archila, Pérez-García, Chiron & Szlach. (Guatemala)
Stanhopea maculosa Knowles & Westc. (W. Mexico)
Stanhopea madouxiana Cogn. (Colombia)
Stanhopea maduroi Dodson & Dressler (Panama to N.Colombia)
Stanhopea manriqueii Jenny & Nauray (Peru) 
Stanhopea marizana Jenny (Peru)
Stanhopea martiana Bateman ex Lindl. (SW. Mexico)
Stanhopea marylenae Archila, Chiron & Pérez-García (Guatemala)
Stanhopea moliana Rolfe (Peru)
Stanhopea napoensis Dodson (Ecuador)
Stanhopea naurayi Jenny (Peru)
Stanhopea nicaraguensis G.Gerlach (Nicaragua)
Stanhopea nigripes Rolfe (Peru)
Stanhopea novogaliciana S.Rosillo (Mexico - Nayarit, Jalisco)
Stanhopea oculata (Lodd.)Lindl. (Mexico to Colombia, SE. Brazil)
Stanhopea oscarrodrigoi Archila, Pérez-García, Chiron & Szlach. (Guatemala)
Stanhopea ospinae Dodson (Colombia)
Stanhopea panamensis N.H.Williams & W.M.Whitten (Panama)
Stanhopea peruviana Rolfe (Peru)
Stanhopea platyceras Rchb.f. (Colombia)
Stanhopea posadae Jenny et Braem (Colombia)
Stanhopea pozoi Dodson & D.E.Benn. (S. Ecuador)
Stanhopea pseudoradiosa Jenny & R.Gonzalez (SW. Mexico)
Stanhopea pulla Rchb.f. (Costa Rica to N. Colombia)
Stanhopea radiosa Lem. (W. Mexico)
Stanhopea reichenbachiana Roezl ex Rchb.f. (Colombia)
Stanhopea rubroatrata Archila, Pérez-García, Chiron & Szlach. (Guatemala)
Stanhopea rubromaculata Archila, Pérez-García, Chiron & Szlach. (Guatemala)
Stanhopea ruckeri Lindl. (= S. inodora; Mexico to C. America)
Stanhopea saccata Bateman (Mexico - Chiapas to C. America)
Stanhopea saintexuperyi Archila, Pérez-García, Chiron & Szlach. (Guatemala)
Stanhopea schilleriana Rchb.f. (Colombia)
Stanhopea shuttleworthii Rchb.f. (Colombia)
Stanhopea stevensonii A.Mejia & R.Escobar ex Jenny (Colombia)
Stanhopea szlachetkoana Archila, Pérez-García & Chiron (Guatemala)
Stanhopea tigrina Bateman ex Lindl. (Mexico)
Stanhopea tolimensis G.Gerlach (Colombia)
Stanhopea tricornis Lindl. (W. South America)
Stanhopea victoriana Archila, Pérez-García, Chiron & Szlach. (Guatemala)
Stanhopea wardii Lodd. ex Lindl. (Nicaragua to Venezuela)
Stanhopea warszewicziana Klotzsch (Costa Rica)
Stanhopea whittenii Soto Arenas, Salazar & G.Gerlach (Mexico to Guatemala)
Stanhopea xanthoviridea Archila, Pérez-García, Chiron & Szlach. (Guatemala)
Stanhopea xytriophora Rchb.f. (S. Peru to Bolivia)

Natural hybrids 
Stanhopea × fowlieana Jenny (S. costaricensis × S. ecornuta) (Costa Rica)
Stanhopea × herrenhusana Jenny (S. reichenbachiana × S. tricornis) (Colombia)
Stanhopea × horichiana Jenny  (S. ecornuta × S. wardii) (Costa Rica)
Stanhopea × lewisae Ames & Correll (S. ecornuta × S. inodora) (Guatemala)
Stanhopea × quadricornis Lindl. (S. grandflora × S. wardii) (Colombia)
Stanhopea × thienii Dodson (S. annulata × S. impressa) (Ecuador)

Intergeneric hybrids 
×  Aciopea (Acineta × Stanhopea). Aciopea Guillermo Gaviria (Acineta erythroxantha × Stanhopea wardii) was registered Nov-Dec 2004 by Guillermo Gaviria-Correa (Colombia).
× Aciopea is abbreviated Aip.
×  Cirrhopea (Cirrhaea × Stanhopea)
×  Coryhopea (Coryanthes × Stanhopea)
×  Stangora (Gongora × Stanhopea)
× Stanhocycnis (Polycycnis × Stanhopea)

Gallery

Species

Natural hybrids

References 

 Gerlach, G. & Beeche, J. 2004: Stanhopeinae Mesoamericanae III (Orchidaceae). Reestablecimiento de Stanhopea ruckeri y una especie nueva: Stanhopea confusa. Lankesteriana 4(3): 213–222.
 Gerlach, G. 2010:  Stanhopeinae Mesoamericanae V: El aroma floral de las Stanhopeas de Mexico. Lankesteriana 9(3): 431–442.
 Rudolf Jenny (December 1993) "The Genus Stanhopea," in: Orchids 62(12):1270-1277
 Rudolf Jenny (December 2003) "The Genus Stanhopea. Part 1: S. anfracta to S. napoensis," in: Caesiana no. 21, Supplement. 200 color photos, 160 p.
 Jenny, R.  (2004)  "The genus Stanhopea: 2nd part, S. nigripes to S. xytriophora"  Caesiana no. 22: 146–291.
  (in German)

External links 
 
 
 Photo collections of Stanhopea from Botanical Garden Munich.
  The Stanhopea Pages website by Nina Rach
  The Stanhopea website by Dick Hartley

 
Stanhopeinae genera
Epiphytic orchids